North Carolina Highway 160 (NC 160) is a primary state highway in the U.S. state of North Carolina.  The highway runs north–south, connecting the Steele Creek neighborhood of Charlotte, Charlotte Douglas International Airport, and Uptown Charlotte.

Route description

NC 160 begins at the South Carolina border, where South Carolina Highway 160 (SC 160) ends near Tega Cay, South Carolina. From the state line, the route heads northwards, crossing South Tryon Street (NC 49) for the first time about  inside North Carolina.

NC 160 winds its next  going through southwest Charlotte's Steele Creek community and industrial district. The main intersection with NC 160 in this area, is at Westinghouse Boulevard; at this point, the route bears the street name Steele Creek Road.

Continuing north, NC 160 crosses over Seddon Rusty Goode Freeway (Interstate 485 (I-485), exit 4).  after crossing I-485, NC 160 crosses into Charlotte's city limits again and enters the city's airport area, where Charlotte Douglas International Airport is located. After entering the area, NC 160 darts east-by-northeast onto West Boulevard, leaving Steele Creek Road (which briefly continues as Dixie Road) to head to the greater airport. NC 160 is the only way to access the Airport Police, the North Carolina Air National Guard station and the Charlotte Aviation Museum.

 after leaving the airport area, NC 160 crosses over Billy Graham Parkway, formerly U.S. Route 521 (US 521), now part of Charlotte Highway 4. NC 160 goes on a few more miles through the urban area of west Charlotte before crossing over the Bill Lee Freeway (I-77/US 21). At this interchange (exit 9A), there are only exits from the southbound lanes of the freeway and entrances onto the northbound lanes of the freeway. To access I-77/US 21 southbound or to access NC 160 from northbound I-77/US 21, one must take an alternate route like Remount Road (exit 8).

NC 160 continues on a northeasterly direction toward Uptown Charlotte. The road, West Boulevard, continues on as East Boulevard at this terminus. Turning north on NC 49 will take the driver to Uptown (downtown).

History
Established in 1942 as a new primary routing, NC 160 was a mere , connecting NC 49 to SC 160 on the South Carolina state line.  Before its establishment, it was a secondary road connecting to then SC 211 (1939–1942).  Between 1956–58, NC 160 was extended north along Steele Creek Road and Morris Field Drive to Wilkinson Boulevard (US 29/US 74).  In 1967, NC 160 was rerouted east along West Boulevard to its current north terminus at NC 49 near Uptown Charlotte.  In the late-1970s, the section near the Charlotte Douglas Airport was moved slightly south to allow airport expansion. Another relocation around a new Norfolk Southern intermodal facility yard near the Charlotte Douglas Airport was constructed between 2010 and 2012.

Junction list

References

160
Transportation in Charlotte, North Carolina
Transportation in Mecklenburg County, North Carolina